Kéthely is a village in Somogy County, Hungary.

The settlement is part of the Balatonboglár wine region.

Etymology
According to local legends the settlement got its name when the two villages Magyari and Sári united. But it is absolutely false because it was first mentioned between 1332 and 1337 as Kedhely. It could be one of those settlements which got their name after their weekly markets (e.g. Szombathely, Szerdahely).

History
According to László Szita the settlement was completely Hungarian in the 18th century.

Gallery

External links 
 Street map (Hungarian)

References 

Populated places in Somogy County